In complex analysis, a partial fraction expansion is a way of writing a meromorphic function   as an infinite sum of rational functions and polynomials. When  is a rational function, this reduces to the usual method of partial fractions.

Motivation

Just as polynomial factorization can be generalized to the Weierstrass factorization theorem, there is an analogy to partial fraction expansions for certain meromorphic functions.

A proper rational function (one for which the degree of the denominator is greater than the degree of the numerator) has a partial fraction expansion with no polynomial terms. Similarly, a meromorphic function  for which  goes to 0 as  goes to infinity at least as quickly as  has an expansion with no polynomial terms.

Calculation

 The origin lies inside each curve 
 No curve passes through a pole of 
  lies inside  for all 
 , where  gives the distance from the curve to the origin

Suppose also that there exists an integer  such that

Writing  for the principal part of the Laurent expansion of  about the point , we have

if . If , then

where the coefficients  are given by

For the other poles  where ,  can be pulled out of the residue calculations:

To avoid issues with convergence, the poles should be ordered so that if  is inside , then  is also inside  for all .

Example

The simplest meromorphic functions with an infinite number of poles are the non-entire trigonometric functions.

so

 for all real , which yields

With this bound on  we can see that

Therefore , and the partial fraction expansion of  looks like

Applications

Infinite products

Applying some logarithm rules,

which finally gives

Laurent series
The partial fraction expansion for a function can also be used to find a Laurent series for it by simply replacing the rational functions in the sum with their Laurent series, which are often not difficult to write in closed form. This can also lead to interesting identities if a Laurent series is already known.

Recall that

We can expand the summand using a geometric series:

Substituting back,

where  are the tangent numbers.

See also
 Partial fraction
 Line integral
 Residue (complex analysis)
 Residue theorem

References
 Markushevich, A.I. Theory of functions of a complex variable. Trans. Richard A. Silverman. Vol. 2. Englewood Cliffs, N.J.: Prentice-Hall, 1965.

Complex analysis
Partial fractions